Old Ones is a book written by Kevin Siembieda and published by Palladium Books in 1984 for the Palladium Fantasy Role-Playing Game. The book outlines the Old Ones (sometimes referred to in Palladium Books publications as the "Great Old Ones" or the "Unnameable Beings"), a fictional race of Alien Intelligences within the megaverse setting of the Palladium Fantasy Role-Playing Game system. After the second edition of the Palladium Fantasy Role-Playing Game was published in 1996, an updated edition of Old Ones was released in 1997.

The Old Ones
Writer Kevin Siembieda named the Old Ones as an homage to the fictional Elder Gods of H. P. Lovecraft.

Lessers
Some other beings are referred to as being possible "lesser" (rather than "greater") Old Ones, including Vampire Intelligences (in Rifts World Book 1: Vampire Kingdoms and Nightbane World Book 4: Shadows of Light), Nxla (in Rifts World Book 12; Psyscape), and Slyth (in Old Ones 2nd Edition).

Publication history
Palladium RPG Book II: Old Ones was written by Kevin Siembieda and was published by Palladium Books in 1984 as a 210-page book.

Reception
In the December 1997 edition of Dragon (Issue 242), Rick Swan called the second edition of Old Ones "a terrific sourcebook". He noted that "The level of detail is staggering; a typical city entry pinpoints more than 100 different locations (temples, granaries, tax offices) and provides dozens of adventure hooks. It’s a grim, vividly evoked world that feels alive; you can smell the sweat at the Gladiator School, taste the elderberry wine at Splash Tavern, feel a pickpocket's blade in your back at the Charm Emporium." He gave the book an above-average rating of 5 out of 6, with the comment "True, Old Ones owes a heavy debt to H. P. Lovecraft, but it’s still a dazzler."

References

Review

Palladium Fantasy Role-Playing Game supplements
Role-playing game supplements introduced in 1984